Chełsty may refer to the following places:
Chełsty, Łódź Voivodeship (central Poland)
Chełsty, Masovian Voivodeship (east-central Poland)
Chełsty, Warmian-Masurian Voivodeship (north Poland)